Hà Đông may refer to several places in Vietnam, including:

Hà Đông District, an urban district of Hanoi
Hà Đông, Gia Lai, a commune of Đắk Đoa District
Hà Đông, Lâm Đồng, a commune of Đạ Tẻh District
Hà Đông, Thanh Hóa, a commune of Hà Trung District